Statistics for curling at the 2018 Winter Olympics.

Percentages
In curling, each player is graded on their shots.

Men's tournament

Percentages by draw.

Lead

Second

Third

Fourth

Women's tournament

Percentages by draw.

Lead

Second

Third

Fourth

Mixed doubles tournament

Percentages by draw.

Female

Male

Team total

References

Statistics